Matias Mäkynen (born 1 September 1990 in Vaasa) is a Finnish politician currently serving in the Parliament of Finland for the Social Democratic Party of Finland at the Vaasa constituency.

References

1990 births
Living people
People from Vaasa
Social Democratic Party of Finland politicians
Members of the Parliament of Finland (2019–23)